Ministry for the Propagation of Virtue and the Prevention of Vice may refer to:
 Ministry for the Propagation of Virtue and the Prevention of Vice (Afghanistan)
 Committee for the Propagation of Virtue and the Prevention of Vice (Gaza Strip)
 Committee for the Promotion of Virtue and the Prevention of Vice (Saudi Arabia)

See also
 Committee for the Promotion of Virtue and the Prevention of Vice (disambiguation)
 Islamic religious police
 Enjoining good and forbidding wrong